Arizona's 9th Legislative District is one of 30 in the state, located entirely in Pima County. As of 2021, there are 57 precincts in the district, with a total registered voter population of 141,913. The district has an overall population of 214,046.

Political representation
The district is represented for the 2021–2022 Legislative Session in the State Senate by Victoria Steele (D, Tucson) and in the House of Representatives by Pamela Hannley (D, Tucson) and Christopher Mathis (D, Tucson).

References

Pima County, Arizona
Arizona legislative districts